Rattery is located within the county of Devon only a few miles from the villages Buckfastleigh and neighbouring village Ashburton the name can sometime be seen a variant of Red Tree but is mentioned in the Domesday Book as Ratreu. The origins of how it got its name remain unknown but had been many possibles answer put across.

The History Of St Mary's Church

The Vicars Of St Mary's

1. Jeffery Hurning: Approx. 1199

2. Walter De Pembroke Approx. 1238

3. Thomas Ballard Approx. 1260-1284

4. Walter Culliebole Approx. 1284-1338

5. John Lambrith Approx. 1338-1349

6. William Budd Approx. 1349-1354

7. Ralph Pataleke Approx. 1354-1364

8. Thomas De Northwode Approx. 1364-1364

9. William Blackhall Approx.1364-1376

10.Lawrence Buscoveleke Approx. 1376-1391

The village is part of the electoral ward of Eastmoor. The ward population at the 2011 census was 2,321.

Historic estates

Various historic estates are situated within the parish of Rattery, including:
Marley House, a Georgian mansion built by Walter Palk (1742-1819), MP, renamed "Syon Abbey" in 1925 when the formerly exiled community of nuns whose antecedents were from Syon Monastery, Twickenham, Middlesex, dissolved by King Henry VIII, took up residence.
Luscombe, a Domesday Book estate mentioned as held from the manor of Dartington and later the seat of the Luscombe family from before the 16th century to shortly before 1810. Purchased from the Luscombe family by Walter Palk (1742-1819). Not to be confused with Luscombe Castle, a 19th-century country house near Dawlish, about 16 miles to the north-east.

References

External links
 Rattery Parish Council

Villages in South Hams
Civil parishes in South Hams